George Benard "Chief" Borchers (April 18, 1869 – October 24, 1938) was a 19th-century Major League Baseball pitcher. In  he led the pitching staff of the minor league Nashville Tigers with the most wins (11-14).

References

External links

1869 births
1938 deaths
Baseball players from Sacramento, California
Major League Baseball pitchers
Chicago White Stockings players
Louisville Colonels players
Portland Gladiators players
19th-century baseball players
Minor league baseball managers
Oakland Greenhood & Morans players
Spokane (minor league baseball) players
Sacramento Senators players
Portland (minor league baseball) players
Stockton (minor league baseball) players
Oakland Colonels players
Spokane Bunchgrassers players
Tacoma Daisies players
Los Angeles Angels (minor league) players
Detroit Creams players
Nashville Tigers players
Minneapolis Millers (baseball) players
Grand Rapids Gold Bugs players
Wheeling Nailers (baseball) players
Milwaukee Brewers (minor league) players
Milwaukee Creams players
Fresno (minor league baseball) players
Watsonville (minor league baseball) players
Santa Cruz (minor league baseball) players
Oakland Oaks (baseball) players
San Jose Brewers players
Oakland Commuters players
Ogden (minor league baseball) players
San Francisco Pirates players